Shumen Province (transliterated Oblast Shumen, former name Shumen okrug) is a province in northeastern Bulgaria named after its main city Shumen. It is divided into 10 municipalities with a total population, as of December 2009, of 194,090 inhabitants.

The Main City 
The city of Shumen is famous in the region for the Monument to 1300 Years of Bulgaria. The monument  is in the cubist style and is 1300 steps (each step representing a year) above the center of the town. Other places of note are the Shumen fortress, Tombul Mosque, and Shumen Plato National park.  The center of the town has a historical museum, large library, and large theater.  The municipality building, also in the center, has a concert hall that features regular symphony performances. Shumen is also the location of the Shumensko Brewery, a popular beer in Bulgaria. The area surrounding Shumen plays a significant part in Bulgarian History with the first and second capitols of historical Bulgaria within thirty kilometers from the city.

Municipalities

The Shumen Province contains 10 municipalities (singular: община, obshtina - plural: общини, obshtini). The following table shows each municipality's name in English and Cyrillic, main town (in bold) or village, and population as of December 2009.

Demographics

The following table represents the change of the population in the province after World War II:

Ethnic groups

Total population (2011 census): 180,528

By self-identified ethnicity (167,952 people):
Bulgarians: 99,446 (59.21%)
Turks:  50,878 (30.29%)
Romani:  13,847 (8.24%)
Others and indefinable:   3,781 (2.25%)
A further 12,000 people did not declare their ethnic group.

Self-identified ethnic group according to the 2001 census (204,378 people out of the total population of 204,395, with percentage of total population):
Bulgarians: 123,084 (60.22%)
Turks: 59,551 (29.14%)
Romani: 16,457 (8.05%)

Religion

Religious adherence in the province according to 2001 census:

Transportation
Shumen lies on the main route between Varna and Sofia and is served by numerous trains and buses serving the city.

See also
Provinces of Bulgaria
List of villages in Shumen Province

References

External links

 
Provinces of Bulgaria
Turkish communities outside Turkey